Jedhe Shakawali or Jedhe Chronology is a bare record of events with dates covering the period from 1618 to 1697 AD kept by the Jedhe Deshmukhs of village Kari located near Bhor in Pune district. It is known to be the valuable source for the political history of the formative period of Maratha Empire. The document was first edited by B.G. Tilak and published by Bharat Itihas Sanshodhak Mandal, Pune, in 1916.

Background
The Jedhes, the Khopades, the Bandals and the Naik-Nimbalkars were the prominent Deshmukhs of Maval.  Out of these, Jedhes of Kaari, in modern-day Bhor, were the Deshmukhs of 'Rohid Khora', which includes the forts of Raireshwar and Rohideshwar, in the Maval region of the modern Pune district, which is near Bhor about 48 km towards south of Pune. Being the leaders of their region, they were privileged persons and enjoyed a high status in political, social and economic life of the region. Kanhoji Jedhe is regarded as the real founder of the Jedhe family as he and his son Baji, popularly known as Sarjerao Jedhe, brought their family to prominence by rendering valuable services to Shivaji, the founder of Maratha Empire in the 17th century. Jedhe Shakawali (chronology) and Jedhe Karina (statement) are their family records which is now regarded as the genuine evidence for many historical events including birth date of Shivaji.

Contents
Jedhe Shakawali pune consists of year-wise data starting from 1618 AD (birth of Aurangzeb) and ending to 1697 AD (the besiege of the Gingee fort). The years are, however, mentioned in terms of 'Shaliwahan Shaka', the Indian year, which is approximately 78 years behind the modern AD.  It also mentions many-a-times about day, date and timing of the event. The main feature of the Jedhe Shakawali is known to be the brief and 'To the point' descriptions of the events.

Select Events 

(Unless specified otherwise, the dates below use Julian calendar.)
Shaka 1540 – Kartik Vadya 1 (Saturday, 24 October 1618 AD) – Birth of Aurangzeb
Shaka 1550 (1628 AD) – Sultan Khurram became Emperor of Delhi under the title of Shah Jehan
Shaka 1551 – Phalgun Vadya 3 (Friday, 19 February 1630) – Birth of Shivaji at Fort Shivneri
Shaka 1579 – Jyeshtha Shuddha 12 (14 May 1657) – A son, Sambhaji, was born to Shivaji
Shaka 1581 – Margashirsh Shuddha 7 (Thursday, 10 November 1659) – Afzalkhan killed by Shivaji near Fort Pratapgad
Shaka 1582 – Ashadh Vadya 1 (13 July 1660) – Shivaji escaped from fort Panhala and fled to fort Vishalgad
Shaka 1585 – Chaitra Shuddha 8 (Sunday, 5 April 1663) – Shivaji attacked Shahiste Khan in Pune and cut off his hand.
Shaka 1587 – Ashadh Shuddha 10 (12 June 1665) – Shivaji made peace with Jai Singh I
Shaka 1588 – Jyeshtha Shuddha 2 (25 May 1666) – Shivaji in Aurangzeb's court
Shaka 1588 – Shravan Vadya 12 (26–27 Aug 1666 Gregorian calendar) – Shivaji escaped from Agra
Shaka 1596 – Jyeshtha Shuddha 12 (6 June 1674) – Shivaji ascended the throne
Shaka 1602 – Chaitra Shuddha 15 (Saturday, 3 April 1680) – Shivaji died at fort Raigad at mid-day
Shaka 1602 – Shravan Shuddha 5 (20 July 1680) – Sambhaji ascended the throne
Shaka 1603 – Kartik Shuddha 13 (Sunday, 13 November 1681) – Sambhaji met rebel prince Akbar at Patshahpur.
Shaka 1605 – Kartik Vadya 7 (1 November 1683) – Sambhaji fought with Portuguese and raised the siege of fort Banda
Shaka 1610 – Magh Vadya 7 (Friday, 1 February 1689) Sambhaji and Kavi Kalash captured by Shaikh Nizam at Sangameshwar
Shaka 1610 – Phalgun Vadya 30 (11 March 1689) – Aurangzeb beheaded Sambhaji and Kavi Kalash at Tulapur
Shaka 1611 – Kartik Vadya 11 (28 October 1689) – Rajaram reached Jinji fort

References

'Jedhe Shakawali – Karina' (Modi / Marathi / English) by Dr. A.R.Kulkarni, 1999 Edition.
'Source Book of Maratha History' by R.P.Patwardhan, Bombay 1929.
'Shivaji Souvenir' by Govind Sakharam Sardesai, Bombay 1926. 

History of Maharashtra
Historiography of India